Electric Psalmbook is the second album by the Norwegian rock band BigBang, which was released in 1999.

Overview
"Volume or Tone" and "Wild Bird (live)" are two bonus tracks added in the Warner release. The Grand Sport Records (Øystein Greni's independent label) LP/CD edition ends on the titletrack.

"Long Distance Man" is Øystein Greni's English adaptation of "Nettenes Prinsesse" (Princess of the Night) written and sung in Norwegian by Thor Sigbjørn Greni, composed by Egil Berg, both from the Undertakers Circus. The original song was available in the Ragnarock LP released in February 1973 by Polydor.

Live versions of the track with Øystein Greni's lyrics were later released on the Smiling For 2001 EP (live at Rockeffeler '01), on the 2003 Radio Radio TV Sleep electric disc and a special duet version with Thor S. Greni's daughter and Øystein Greni's sister- Taran Greni was included in the Radio Radio TV Sleep acoustic disc and on the DVD edition.

An anterior version of "How Do You Do?" was released on the 1997 How Do You Do? / Something Better limited print vinyl single.

Track listing
All tracks by Øystein Greni

 "Wild Bird" – 3:12
 "Something Special" – 4:12
 "Still Have The Time" – 4:28
 "So In Love" – 3:03
 "How Do You Do?" – 3:23
 "In Love With You" – 3:25
 "Major Pronin" – 2:19
 "Make A Circle" – 3:34
 "Reflection" – 3:50
 "Long Distance Man" (Undertakers Circus instrumental cover) – 4:33
 "Electric Psalmbook" – 3:50
 "Volume Or Tone" (bonus track) – 3:46
 "Wild Bird (live at Norwegian Wood '99)" – 4:41

Personnel
Øystein Greni – lead vocals and guitars
Erik Tresselt - bass and backing vocals
Martin Horntveth - drums, percussion and backing vocals, accordion on "Electric Psalmbook"
Christer Engen - drums and percussion on "Wild Bird", falsetto on "So In Love" and "How Do You Do"
Knut Schreiner - lead guitar on "Long Distance Man"
Vegar Bakke - organ on "So In Love"

References

1999 albums
Bigbang (Norwegian band) albums